The St. Joseph Convent and Academy is a historic Roman Catholic church convent and school off OK 33 in Guthrie, Oklahoma, United States.  It added to the National Register in 1979.

Its building was built in 1892 and expanded in 1905.  It is Second Empire in style.  It housed the St. Joseph Academy, a boarding school for girls, starting in 1897.

References

Roman Catholic churches completed in 1892
Buildings and structures in Logan County, Oklahoma
Properties of religious function on the National Register of Historic Places in Oklahoma
School buildings on the National Register of Historic Places in Oklahoma
Guthrie, Oklahoma
National Register of Historic Places in Logan County, Oklahoma
1892 establishments in Oklahoma Territory
19th-century Roman Catholic church buildings in the United States